The Deadly Game (1941) is a thriller starring Charles Farrell. The film was written by Wellyn Totman and directed by Phil Rosen. It was Farrell's 53rd and final film appearance, although he would reemerge more than a decade later on television as the lead in My Little Margie.

Cast
 Charles Farrell as Barry Scott
 June Lang as Christine Reisner
 John Miljan as Henri Franck
 Bernadene Hayes as Mona Brandt
 J. Arthur Young as Dr. Reisner
 Kurt Kreuger as Lieutenant

External links
 The Deadly Game at IMDB

1941 films
World War II films made in wartime
Films directed by Phil Rosen
1940s thriller films
Monogram Pictures films
American thriller films
American black-and-white films